Dunbarton College of Holy Cross, Washington, D.C. was one of three now-defunct women's colleges sponsored by the Sisters of the Holy Cross, along with College of Saint Mary-of-the-Wasatch in Salt Lake City and Cardinal Cushing College in Brookline, Massachusetts. Dunbarton College of Holy Cross operated from 1935 to 1973.

The college was founded by M. Rose Elizabeth, a member of the Sisters of the Holy Cross; she was also the college’s first president.

In 1974, Howard University purchased the campus to house the Howard University School of Law, which still occupies the campus on Van Ness Street Northwest.

Notable faculty include novelist Elizabeth Mansfield and former NOAA Administrator Nancy Foster who was chair of the biology department.

References

External links
 Closed Institutional Records available from Sisters of the Holy Cross

Defunct private universities and colleges in Washington, D.C.
Defunct Catholic universities and colleges in the United States
Educational institutions established in 1935
Educational institutions disestablished in 1973
1935 establishments in Washington, D.C.
1973 disestablishments in Washington, D.C.
Women in Washington, D.C.